Association Sportive du Faso-Yennenga is a Burkinabé football club based in Ouagadougou. The club's home games are played at Stade du 4-Août.

The club was founded in 1947 and won its first title in 1973 as Jeanne d'Arc.

History
The club was founded in 1947 under the name of AS Jeanne d'Arc.

Achievements
Burkinabé Premier League: 13
 1973, 1989, 1995, 1999, 2002, 2003, 2004, 2006, 2009, 2010, 2011, 2012, 2013.

Coupe du Faso: 3
 1991, 2009, 2013

Burkinabé SuperCup: 2
 2001–02, 2008–09.

West African Club Championship (UFOA Cup): 1
 1999.

Performance in CAF competitions
CAF Champions League: 10 appearances
2000 – First round
2003 – First round
2004 – First round
2005 – First round
2007 – Preliminary Round
2010 – First round
2011 – First round
2012 – Preliminary Round
2013 – First round
2014 – First round

 African Cup of Champions Clubs: 3 appearances
1973 – First Round
1990 – Preliminary Round
1996 – First Round

CAF Cup: 3 appearances
1993 – First Round
1998 – First Round
2002 – First Round

CAF Cup Winners' Cup: 2 appearances
1991 – Quarter-finals
1992 – First Round

Managers
 Guglielmo Arena
 Dan Anghelescu (2006–07)
 Cheick Oumar Koné (2009–14)
 Michel Kigoma

References

Football clubs in Burkina Faso
Association football clubs established in 1947
Sport in Ouagadougou
1947 establishments in French Upper Volta